Anacithara punctostriata is a species of sea snail, a marine gastropod mollusk in the family Horaiclavidae.

Description
The length of the shell attains 10.5 mm.

Distribution
This marine species occurs off Madagascar

References

 Bozzetti, L., 2009. Anacithara punctostriata e Eucithara pulchra (Gastropoda: Hypsogastropoda: Conidae: Clathurellinae) due nuove specie dal Madagascar meridionale. Malacologia Mostra Mondiale 63: 8–10

External links
 

punctostriata
Gastropods described in 2009